The following is a list of notable clinical studies of hormonal birth control in premenopausal women:
 Royal College of General Practitioners Oral Contraception Study
 Oxford/Family Planning Association Contraceptive Study (Oxford–FPA Study)
 Kaiser Permanente Walnut Creek Contraceptive Drug Study (CDS)
 World Health Organization Special Programme on Human Reproduction (HRP)
 Oral Contraceptive and Hemostasis Study Group
 International Active Surveillance Study – Safety of Contraceptives: Role of Estrogens (INAS-SCORE)
 Prospective Controlled Cohort Study on the Safety of a Monophasic Oral Contraceptive Containing Nomegestrol Acetate (2.5mg) and 17β-Estradiol (1.5mg) (PRO-E2)

See also
 List of clinical studies of menopausal hormone therapy

References

Clinical trials
Endocrinology